Canal i is a privately owned 24-news channel based in Caracas, Venezuela which can be seen over-the-air in the cities of Caracas, Maracaibo, and Barquisimeto on channels 57, 53, and 63 respectively.  It was officially inaugurated on October 5, 2007.

History
Canal i was officially inaugurated on October 5, 2007, taking over the signal of the now defunct music channel, Puma TV.  Canal i is a 24-hour news channel; it is the fourth Venezuelan 24-hour news channel to be founded after Globovisión, Canal de Noticias, and TeleSUR.  The president of Canal i, Wilmer Ruperti, invested $ 21 million  in order to establish the network.

The idea to create Canal i dates back to 2004 when Ruperti purchased Puma TV, however, the project was delayed until 2006. Canal i aims to provide a fair and balanced news programming that does not have any political affiliations.  Some of Canal i's presenters include Carlos Escarrá, a pro-Chávez congressperson and member of the United Socialist Party of Venezuela, and Julio Borges, the leader of Justice First, the second largest opposition party.

External links
canal-i.com

Television channels and stations established in 2007
Television stations in Venezuela
24-hour television news channels
Television networks in Venezuela
Spanish-language television stations
Mass media in Caracas